Drane is a surname. Notable people with the surname include:

Augusta Theodosia Drane (1823–1894), English writer and Roman Catholic nun
Ashley Drane (born 1981), American film and television actress
Dwight Drane (born 1962), American football player
Herbert J. Drane (1863–1947), American politician
James Drane (1808–1869), American politician
John Drane, theologian